Hyposmocoma argyresthiella is a species of moth of the family Cosmopterigidae. It was first described by Lord Walsingham in 1907. It is endemic to the Hawaiian islands of Kauai, Oahu, Molokai and Hawaii. The type locality is Kaawaloa, Kona, where it was collected at an elevation above .

The larvae have been reared from silken tunnels in moss.

External links

argyresthiella
Endemic moths of Hawaii
Moths described in 1907
Taxa named by Thomas de Grey, 6th Baron Walsingham